In France, Italy, Belgium, and some other civil law countries, a circulaire (French), circolare (Italian) or omzendbrief (Dutch) consists of a text intended for the members of a service, of an enterprise, or of an administration.

Within the French and Belgian civil service, a circulaire originates from a ministry with the aim of giving an interpretation of a legal text or of a regulation (a  decree, arrêté or Royal Order), with a view to applying such a regulation consistently. As such, a circulaire depends on the general principles of law, but carries more weight than mere administrative acts.

Circulaires provide recommendations: they apply only to employees of the civil service. In certain cases, circulaires introduce new rules (circulaires réglementaires); such that under certain conditions one can appeal against abuse of power.

The body of jurisprudence relating to circulaires has developed extensively. In principle, circulaires exist only to comment on existing law and to explain its application in concrete terms.

The contentious side of circulaires, of notes de services and of instructions has brought about several legal responses, varying according to several criteria and according to the type of text involved:

 the regulatory nature of the text

 the character of the measure of internal administration
 the regulatory power of Ministers within their Departments

 Government decisions

The Conseil d'État (French) or Raad van State (Dutch) thus far retains a unique criterion for determining whether to bring a disputed decision in front of a judge: the imperative character of the decision. If this condition applies, judges examine the legality of the text. This has been the case for the Peeters directive in Belgium, restricting the use of French in officially Dutch-speaking municipalities.

References 

Law of France
Belgian legislation

pt:Circular